Letheringham Priory was a priory in Suffolk, England.

Burials
Robert Wingfield
Anthony Wingfield

References

Monasteries in Suffolk